Aleixo Reginaldo Lourenco also known as Reginaldo is an Indian politician from the state of Goa. He is a four term member of the Goa Legislative Assembly for Curtorim. He has been Chairman of the Goa Industrial Development Corporation since 2022. 

In 2022, he lent his support as an Independent to the Bharatiya Janata Party to form the Government in Goa.

Committees in the Goa Legislative Assembly 
He was member of the following committees in the house till 2021 

 Seventh Legislative Assembly 2017
 Sixth Legislative Assembly 2012
 Member, Estimates Committee
 Member, Committee On Petitions
 Member, Select Committee on The Goa Succession, Special Notaries and Inventory 
 Fifth Legislative Assembly 2007-2012
 Member, Committee On Delegated Legislation
 Member, Estimates Committee
 Member, Committee On Public Undertakings
 Member, Select Committee On The Goa Agricultural Tenancy (Amendment) 
 Member, Select Committee On The Goa Land Use (Regulation, Amendment) 
 Member, Select Committee On The Goa Mundkars (Protection from Eviction)
 Member, Select Committee On The Goa Public Service Guarantee

Lok Sabha
He contested the 2014 Lok Sabha election from south Goa, losing to the Bharatiya Janata Party candidate.

Electoral history

2022 result

2017

2014

2012 result

2007 result

References

External links
Goa Vidhan Sabha - Profile Page

Living people
Former members of Indian National Congress from Goa
People from Panaji
Goa MLAs 2007–2012
Goa MLAs 2012–2017
Goa MLAs 2017–2022
Year of birth missing (living people)
Former members of Trinamool Congress
Goa MLAs 2022–2027